Bruno Nogueira Barbosa (born 28 April 1994), commonly known as Bruno, is a Brazilian footballer who currently plays as a defender for Speranța Nisporeni.

Career statistics

Club

Notes

References

1994 births
Living people
Brazilian footballers
Brazilian expatriate footballers
Association football defenders
Associação Ferroviária de Esportes players
Sociedade Esportiva Recreativa e Cultural Brasil players
Grêmio Esportivo Bagé players
Clube Atlético Itapemirim players
Speranța Nisporeni players
Moldovan Super Liga players
Brazilian expatriate sportspeople in Moldova
Expatriate footballers in Moldova